Psapp ( or ) is a British experimental electronica band. The band, a duo consisting of Carim Clasmann and Galia Durant, are sometimes credited with inventing a musical style known as toytronica, a form of electronica made with toys and toy instruments. They are also noted for their use of found sounds and homemade instruments, including the meowing of live cats, a "mechanical chicken", and a xylophone-like instrument made of bones they call the "boneaphone". They have released five albums, a Japan Exclusive Mini-Album, Northdown, and five EPs. 

Psapp composed the song "Cosy in the Rocket", the main theme on the medical-drama TV series Grey's Anatomy, for which they have received multiple BMI awards. Some of their other songs have been used in other American TV shows such as The OC and Nip/Tuck as well as the UK Channel 4 TV show Sugar Rush.

In 2015 they were chosen by David Byrne to play at the Meltdown Festival in London.

Psapp's fourth album, What Makes Us Glow, was released on 11 November 2013, and their fifth album Tourists, was released on 2 September 2019, both under the label The state51 Conspiracy.

Psapp are known for their humour on stage, throwing toy cats (hand-made by the band) into the audience.

Discography

Albums
Tiger, My Friend (2004)
The Only Thing I Ever Wanted (2006)
The Camel's Back (2008)
What Makes Us Glow (2013)
 Tourists (2019)

EPs
Do Something Wrong (2003)
Rear Moth (2004)
Buttons and War (2004)
Early Cats and Tracks (2006)
Hi (2006)
Early Cats and Tracks Volume 2 (2009)

Singles
"Tricycle" (2006)
"The Monster Song" (2008)
"I Want That" (2009)
"Wet Salt" (2013)

Other
Tracks for Horses (2003) - "Difficult Key"
Indoor Shed (2003) - "Scissory"
Northdown (2004)
Grey's Anatomy Soundtrack (2005) - "Cosy in the Rocket"
Merry Mixmas (2005) - "I've Got My Love to Keep Me Warm"
Rewind! 5 (2006) - "Ev'rybody Wants to Be a Cat"
Take It Easy: 15 Soft Rock Anthems (2006) - "Year of the Cat" (cover of Al Stewart song)
David Shrigley's Worried Noodles (2007) - "Sad Song"
 Hallam Foe Soundtrack (2007) - "Tricycle" and "Eating Spiders"
Verve Remixed, Vol. 4 (2008) - "Bim Bom"

References

External links
Psapp official website
Psapp jumble shop (official)
 Psapp at Domino Records
2009 Psapp Interview at Bandega.com
Psapp Videoclip: "What is really important to you?"
RBMA Radio On Demand - Fireside Chat - Psapp (Domino Records, UK)

British electronic music groups
Musical groups from London
Domino Recording Company artists